Evgeniy Vasilievich Chuikov (Russian language: Евгений Васильевич Чуйков; May 18, 1924 – February 15, 2000) was a Ukrainian landscape painter working in the Russian realist (The Wanderers) and French Impressionist traditions.

Life and work

Early years and the Second World War

Evgeniy Chuikov was born in the village of Nizhniy Reut, Kursk region, Russia.  His father Vasiliy Chuikov was an accountant and Evgeniy was the second eldest of three brothers. In 1933 the family moved to Zaporizhzhia, Ukraine and Chuikov began attending the local art school under the stewardship I.F.Fedyanin. He quickly distinguished himself with his strong visual memory and intuitive feeling for colour but the pursuit of further art education was however halted by the commencement of the Second World War.

In 1943, at the age of 19, he enrolled into the Red Army and joined the 3rd Ukrainian Front (Southwestern Front). He was assigned to a reconnaissance unit and took part in the Russian advance across the Dnieper. As the Red Army progressed, Chuikov joined the 3rd Belorussian Front and fought in the Prague Offensive and the Battle of Berlin. He served in Berlin until 1946 after which time he returned to Zaporizhzhia. For his service during the War he was awarded the 2nd and 3rd Order of Glory and the Medal "For Courage" as well as numerous other accolades.

Post War and the Zaporizhzhia school of art

In 1948, working as an artist designer at Zaporizhstal, Chuikov became friends with several other young artists and had joined the local artist workshop. It was at this moment that the Zaporizhzhia school of art was born and encompassed other artists like G. Kolosovsky, Korobov, Fomin and Akinshin.

Together they were united by their fascination and love of nature. In the footsteps of the Russian realists and beyond Impressionists they tried to convey not simply the light, tone and colour but the sound and air of any given moment.

Chuikov’s influence on the formation of the school and his fellow artists was profound.
As a member of the USSR Union of Artists, Chuikov embarked on the formation of the Zaporizhzhia branch of the Artists’ Union of Ukraine (USSR Union of Artists) established in 1963, which he oversaw as Chairman for over 20 years whilst also serving on the governing board of the Artists’ Union of Ukraine.

Yet it is his artistic influence which is most celebrated. In the late 1960s after several painting trips to the historic Russian city of Vladimir, he was introduced to the Vladimir school of art and became friends with such artists as V.Ukin, K.Britov and V.Kokurin. Their decorative, colour-saturated canvases made a big impact on Chuikov’s work. His landscapes became more assertive with colour and brush strokes and developed a historic melancholy characteristic of such 19th-century Russian realists as Arkady Rylov and Isaac Levitan. His work of that period, including the series dedicated to Alexandre Pushkin “Mikhailovskoe”(Pushkin (town)) dramatically influenced the Zaporizhzhia school introducing his fellow artists to a more decorative, lighter palette.

In 1977 Chuikov was awarded the title of Merited Artist of Ukraine (Meritorious Artist) and in 1997 the highest award – the title of the People's Artist of Ukraine.

Exhibitions

Throughout his artistic career he took part in over 70 national, republican and regional exhibitions. He also participated in over 20 international exhibitions primarily in the United Kingdom, Canada, USA and France.

Collections

Chuikov’s paintings can be found in many museums across Russia and Former Soviet Union Republics including The National Art Museum of Ukraine, Moscow Art Academy, Zaporizhzhia Art Museum, Donetsk Art Museum, Sumy Art Museum.

Bibliography
 N. Bazhan, History of Ukrainian Painting, 1968
 I. Churina, Landscapes of Evgeniy Chuikov, 1971
 S. Latanskiy, Evgeniy Chuikov, personal exhibition catalogue, 1985
 Artist Rating Encyclopaedia, Volume VII, Moscow, 2006
 Matthew Cullerne Bown, A Dictionary of Twentieth Century Russian and Soviet Painters 1900-80s, 1998, Izo

1924 births
2000 deaths
20th-century Russian painters
Russian male painters
Soviet military personnel of World War II
Soviet painters
Ukrainian painters
Ukrainian male painters
Ukrainian people of Russian descent
Recipients of the Order of Glory
People from Zaporizhzhia
20th-century Russian male artists